Norman Ernest Jacob (9 July 1901 – 12 March 1970) was a Welsh cricketer.  Jacob was a right-handed batsman who bowled right-arm medium pace.  He was born at Neath, Glamorgan.

Jacob made his first-class debut Glamorgan in the 1922 County Championship against Lancashire at Old Trafford, Manchester.  He played a further 6 first-class matches in the 1922 season, with his final first-class appearance for the county coming against Leicestershire at Cardiff Arms Park.  In his 7 first-class matches, he scored 79 runs at a batting average of 6.07, with a top score of 19.

Jacob died at Grimsby, Lincolnshire on 12 March 1970.

References

External links
Norman Jacob at Cricinfo
Norman Jacob at CricketArchive

1901 births
1970 deaths
Cricketers from Neath
Welsh cricketers
Glamorgan cricketers